Narrowteuthis is a monotypic genus of squid, the sole member is Narrowteuthis nesisi, from the family Neoteuthidae. It is known from just two specimens caught off the Canary Islands at  27°18'N, 19°44'W.

References

Squid
Molluscs described in 2005
Monotypic mollusc genera